The 1973 All-Ireland Senior Club Camogie Championship for the leading clubs in the women's team field sport of camogie was won by Oranmore (Gal), who defeated St Paul’s (Kk) in the final, played at Nowlan Park.

Arrangements
The championship was organised on the traditional provincial system used in Gaelic Games since the 1880s, with St Patrick’s Creggan, based in Randalstown, County Antrim and Thurles winning the championships of the other two provinces. Oranmore had no opposition in the Connacht championship.

The Final
Portglenone were the first to score in the final, a well taken goal by Frances Graham, Pauline Brennan soon had Stacks level and then put them ahead by a point. Anne Sheehy stretched the Stacks lead with a goal that was negated by a goal by Edna Webb, but Anne Sheehy availed of a defensive error to goal again and leave Stacks ahead by 3-1 to 2-0 at the interval. Stack’s fourth goal by Mary Sherlock soon after the resumption, made the issue reasonably safe for Stacks. Portglenone, thanks to some magnificent play by Mairéad McAtamney at midfield, had their chances in this half but failed to make any impression in the sound Stacks defence and the only other score went to Stacks, a point from a thirty.
 Agnes Hourigan wrote in the Irish Press: In a well contested final that produced some very entertaining passages, there was not a great deal between the sides, but Austin Stacks were far the better combined side. Their teamwork was always outstanding and their far greater match play experience was always obvious both in attack and defence. Mairéad McAtamney was once again the inspiration of Portglenone but the forwards could not turn to account the many chances the great midfielder provided.

Final stages

References

External links
 Camogie Association

1973 in camogie
1973